Islay is an island in the Inner Hebrides, Scotland.

Islay may also refer to

Places
 Islay Airport, airport on Islay
 Islay Island (Antarctica)
 Islay Hill, USA
 Islay Province, Peru
 Islay District, Peru
 Islay, Alberta, a hamlet in Alberta, Canada
 Islay, Ontario, Canada
 Sound of Islay, strait between Islay and Jura

People
 Islay Burns, Scottish theologian, 1817–1872
 Lord of Islay, chief of Clan Donald of Islay

Ships
 BAP Islay (SS-35), Peruvian submarine
 HMS Islay, World War II British ship

Other
 Battle of Islay, battle of 1838 between Chile and Peru-Bolivia
 Islay Charter, a charter of 1408
 Islay LIMPET, the world's first commercial wave power device
 Islay (novel), a novel by Douglas Bullard
 Islay whisky, a range of alcoholic beverages
 Islay, a shrub, Prunus ilicifolia